is a passenger railway station located in  Sakai-ku, Sakai, Osaka Prefecture, Japan, operated by the private railway operator Nankai Electric Railway. It has the station number "NK58".

Lines

Layout
The station consists of two opposed side platforms connected by a footbridge.

Platforms

Adjacent stations

History
Mozuhachiman Station opened on September 7, 1900.

Passenger statistics
In fiscal 2019, the station was used by an average of 4,545 passengers daily.

Surrounding area
Mozuhachiman-gu
Sakai City Sakai High School
Seikeikai Medical College

See also
 List of railway stations in Japan

References

External links

  

Railway stations in Japan opened in 1900
Railway stations in Osaka Prefecture
Sakai, Osaka